Amir Khanlu (also Romanized as Amīr Khānlū) is a village in Qeshlaq-e Gharbi Rural District, Aslan Duz District, Parsabad County, Ardabil Province, Iran. At the 2006 census, its population was 135, in 25 families.

References 

Towns and villages in Parsabad County